Georgi may refer to:
 Georgi (given name)
 Georgi (surname)

See also
Georgy (disambiguation)
Georgii (disambiguation)